The 1931 Brisbane Rugby League premiership was the 23rd season of Brisbane's semi-professional rugby league football competition. Eight teams from across Brisbane competed for the premiership, which culminated in Fortitude Valley defeating Past Grammars (now Norths Devils) 27-9 in the grand final.

Ladder

Finals

Grand Final 
Fortitude Valley 27 (Tries: Scott, B. Donovan, Martin, Wing 2, Shields. Goals: Shields 3)

Past Grammars 9 (Tries: Morrison. Goals: Holden 3)

References

Rugby league in Brisbane
Brisbane Rugby League season